Norman R. Brokaw (April 21, 1927 – October 29, 2016) was an American talent agent. He served as the president, chief executive officer, and chairman of the William Morris Agency. He represented Marilyn Monroe, Donna Summer, Bill Cosby, Mark Spitz, Warren Beatty, Clint Eastwood, and many more.

Early life
Norman Brokaw was born on April 21, 1927 in New York City, the son of Marie and Isidore Brokaw. His parents were Russian Jewish immigrants. His maternal grandparents, known as the Haidaburas, were "the first Russian acrobatic dance troupe to appear on the American vaudeville stage". His maternal uncle, Johnny Hyde, was the vice president of the William Morris Agency.

Brokaw relocated to Los Angeles when he was a teenager.

Career
Brokaw delivered mail for the William Morris Agency in 1943, at the age of 15. By the 1950s, he encouraged William Morris to get into the television business. He helped create such series as Racket Squad and Public Defender by moving 1950s film stars to television. Brokaw would go on to represent producers of Gomer Pyle, U.S.M.C., The Dick Van Dyke Show, and The Andy Griffith Show.

Brokaw was appointed as the president and CEO of the William Morris Agency in 1989. He became its CEO and chairman in 1991.

Philanthropy
Brokaw was the co-founder of the Betty Ford Cancer Center. He also served as its president. Additionally, he served on the boards of trustees of the Cedars-Sinai Medical Center and the St. Jude Children's Research Hospital.

Personal life and death
Brokaw  married three times. He had six children: David Brokaw, Sanford Brokaw and Joel Brokaw with his first wife; Barbara Brokaw and Wendy Brokaw Kretchmer with his second wife; and Lauren Brokaw with his third wife, Marguerite Longley.

Brokaw died on October 29, 2016 in Beverly Hills, California. He was 89.

References

1927 births
2016 deaths
American people of Russian-Jewish descent
Jewish American philanthropists
Businesspeople from New York City
People from Beverly Hills, California
Hollywood talent agents
Businesspeople from California
American chief executives
Philanthropists from New York (state)
20th-century American businesspeople
20th-century American philanthropists
21st-century American Jews